Wolf warrior diplomacy is a style of coercive diplomacy adopted by Chinese diplomats during the Xi Jinping administration. The term was coined from the Chinese action film Wolf Warrior 2. This approach is in contrast to the prior Chinese diplomatic practices of Deng Xiaoping and Hu Jintao, which had emphasized the use of cooperative rhetoric and the avoidance of controversy.

Wolf warrior diplomacy is confrontational and combative, with its proponents denouncing any perceived criticism of the Chinese government, its ruling Chinese Communist Party (CCP), and associated policies on social media and in interviews, as well as using physical violence against protestors and dissidents. As an attempt to gain "discourse power" in international politics, wolf warrior diplomacy forms one part of a new foreign policy strategy called Xi Jinping's "Major Country Diplomacy" which has legitimized a more active role for China on the world stage, including engaging in an open ideological struggle with the Western world.

Although the phrase "wolf warrior diplomacy" was popularized as a description of this diplomatic approach during the COVID-19 pandemic, the appearance of similar diplomatic rhetoric began a few years prior. CCP general secretary Xi Jinping's foreign policy writ large, perceived anti-China hostility from the West among Chinese government officials, and shifts within the Chinese diplomatic bureaucracy have been cited as factors leading to its emergence.

Coercive economic measures may also be part of wolf warrior diplomacy, with China imposing trade sanctions on nations who "fail to toe its line." It has been assessed that, between 2008 and 2022, China has economically coerced 16 countries.

Etymology
The phrase is derived from the title of the patriotic Chinese action film Wolf Warrior 2. The tagline of the film was "Whoever attacks China will be killed no matter how far the target is." At the end of the film a cover of the Chinese passport is displayed along with some text, which reads "Citizens of the PRC: When you encounter danger in a foreign land, do not give up! Please remember, at your back stands a strong motherland."

Overview

When Deng Xiaoping came to power following Mao Zedong's death in the late 1970s, he prescribed a foreign policy summed up with the Chinese idiom tāoguāng-yǎnghuì, and emphasized the avoidance of controversy and the use of cooperative rhetoric. This idiom—which originally referred to biding one's time without revealing one's strength—encapsulated Deng's strategy to "observe calmly, secure our position, cope with affairs calmly, hide our capacities and bide our time, be good at maintaining a low profile, and never claim leadership."

In contrast, the Chinese government's wolf warrior diplomacy in the 21st century is characterized by the use of confrontational rhetoric by Chinese diplomats, coercive behavior, as well their increased willingness to rebuff criticism of the government and its policies, and court controversy in interviews and on social media. It is a departure from former Chinese foreign policy, which focused on working behind the scenes, avoiding controversy and favoring a rhetoric of international cooperation, exemplified by the maxim that China "must hide its strength" in international diplomacy. This change reflects a larger change in how the Chinese government and the CCP relate and interact with the larger world. Efforts aimed at incorporating the Chinese diaspora into China's foreign policy have also intensified. As Brian Wong writing for The Diplomat states, "Chinese diplomats have actively sought to portray the ongoing political fallout from COVID-19 as an ethnocentric assault on all Chinese, regardless of nationality and political citizenship."

Wolf warrior diplomacy began to emerge in 2017, although components of it had already been incorporated into Chinese diplomacy before then. An assertive diplomatic push resembling wolf" warrior diplomacy was also noted following the Great Recession. The emergence of wolf warrior diplomacy has been tied to Xi Jinping's political ambitions and foreign policy inclinations, especially his "Major Country Diplomacy", which has legitimized a more active role for China on the world stage, including engaging in open ideological struggle with the West. Wolf warrior diplomacy has been attributed to the Xi Jinping Thought on Diplomacy, as well as perceived "anti-China hostility" and fear of "ideological designs" from the West amongst Chinese government officials.

One factor which may have helped bring about wolf warrior diplomacy was the addition of a public relations section to internal employee performance reports. This incentivized Chinese diplomats to be active on social media and give controversial interviews. Additionally, a younger cadre of diplomats that worked its way up the ranks of the Chinese diplomatic service and this generational shift is also seen as accounting for part of the change. Activity on social media was greatly increased and the tone of social media engagement became more direct and confrontational. CCP officials say wolf warrior diplomacy is a "necessary" response to Western diplomats' social media presences. More specifically, foreign vice-minister Le Yucheng says he believes that foreign countries "are coming to our doorstep, interfering in our family affairs, constantly nagging at us, insulting and discrediting us, [so] we have no choice but to firmly defend our national interests and dignity."

"Wolf warrior" began to see use as a buzzword during the COVID-19 pandemic. In Europe, leaders have expressed surprise at the Chinese using a diplomatic tone with them that they previously would only have used with small or weak countries, with the messaging shifting from a tone of collaboration to one of opposition.Peter Martin has noted that although "many Chinese diplomats are aware that the response to wolf warrior diplomacy has been very negative and actually damaged China’s interests in a wide range of cases...those who have misgivings need to keep their thoughts to themselves for now, or they will face political repercussions." Martin noted the trend "as during previous periods of assertive diplomacy from China, the primary audience is domestic politicians. Therefore, the reaction of foreigners and outsiders is not a top motivator for Chinese diplomats".

Following a deterioration of China's international reputation, Communist Party general secretary Xi Jinping called for improvements in the country's international communication at a May 2021 Party Politburo group study session. Several other events in 2021 were interpreted by The Diplomat as evidence "that leaders in Beijing are recalibrating China’s external messaging, signaling to the wolf warriors that a gradual softening of tone is in order," including the departure of Hu Xijin, editor of the CCP-owned tabloid Global Times, an early adopter of wolf warrior rhetoric. This further continued by 2023, when Zhao Lijian became the deputy director of Department of Boundary and Ocean Affairs Department since January 2023, being moved to there from the Information Department, effectively ending his tenure as spokesperson.

Proponents and practices

Aside from China's leader Xi Jinping himself, both the Chinese foreign affairs system and the state media/propaganda system have prominent proponents of "wolf warrior" diplomacy or its style of communication. These include Zhao Lijian, Hua Chunying, Wang Wenbin, Liu Xiaoming, and Hu Xijin. Ambassador to France Lu Shaye also has a reputation as a wolf-warrior diplomat. In his view, the rise of such diplomacy reflects the rising national strength of China and its relation to the changing international environment.

Chinese diplomats who favor wolf warrior diplomacy view it as a natural response to Western efforts to contain China and what they see as nitpicking criticisms of China.

Economic coercion 
Beginning in 2008, China appears to have used economic coercion to change its international relations. CSIS has identified 16 nations and over 120 global companies as being coerced through trade boycotts, punitive tariffs and "weaponizing" trade interdependence between 2008 and 2022. China has used trade to coerce countries such as Australia, imposing prohibitive tariffs on barley and wine as a punishment for their call for an inquiry on the origins of COVID-19. One business that has been coerced is the NBA, with China suspending broadcasts of Houston Rockets games, because its manager had tweeted his support for the Hong Kong democracy protesters.

2018 APEC summit
When Papua New Guinea hosted the APEC Summit in 2018, four Chinese diplomats barged in uninvited on Rimbink Pato, Papua New Guinea's foreign minister, arguing for changes to the communiqué proclaiming "unfair trade practices" which they felt targeted China. The bilateral discussion was rebuffed as bilateral negotiations with an individual delegation would jeopardise the country's neutrality as host.

Chinese embassy in Sweden

In November 2019, Ambassador Gui Congyou threatened Sweden during an interview with broadcaster Swedish PEN saying that "We treat our friends with fine wine, but for our enemies we got shotguns", over the decision to award Gui Minhai with the Tucholsky Prize. All eight major Swedish political parties condemned the Ambassador's threats. On 4 December, after the prize had been awarded, Ambassador Gui said that one could not both harm China's interests and benefit economically from China. When asked to clarify his remarks he said that China would impose trade restrictions on Sweden, these remarks were backed up by the Chinese Foreign Ministry in Beijing. The embassy has systematically worked to influence the reporting on China by Swedish journalists. In April 2021 it was revealed that the Chinese embassy threatened a journalist working for the newspaper Expressen. Several political parties publicly expressed that they believe the ambassador should be declared persona non grata and deported on the basis that his actions violated the constitution of Sweden. Within Gui's first two years of the ambassadorship, Sweden's Foreign Ministry summoned him over forty times to protest Gui's remarks.

2020 Zhao Lijian image controversy

In late 2020, Chinese foreign ministry spokesman Zhao Lijian used his Twitter account to circulate a digitally-manipulated image of a child having their throat cut by an Australian soldier in response to the release of the Brereton Report. Global commentators called the tweet "a sharp escalation" in the dispute between China and Australia. Within hours, the image was found to have been created by Wuheqilin, a self-styled Chinese wolf warrior artist.

Reuters reported Australian Prime Minister Scott Morrison describing Zhao's tweet as "truly repugnant" and stating that "the Chinese government should be utterly ashamed of this post. It diminishes them in the world's eyes." The next day, the Chinese foreign ministry rejected Australian demands for an apology. The incident was damaging to Australia–China relations. The effect of Zhao's tweet has been to unify Australian politicians across party lines in condemning the incident and China more generally. On the other hand, Zhao's tweet also garnered a strong wave of Chinese nationalism support in the country, with Wuheqilin's Sina Weibo account doubling in followers to 1.24 million. Security analyst Anthony Galloway later described the event as "a grey zone attack if ever there was one."

Chinese embassy in France
The Ambassador to France, Lu Shaye, was summoned twice by the French foreign ministry, first in April 2020 over posts and tweets by the embassy defending Beijing's response to the COVID-19 pandemic and criticising the West's handling of it, then in March 2021 over "insults and threats" over new Western sanctions placed on China for its crackdown against the Uyghur minority. Previously as Ambassador to Canada, Shaye accused Canadian media of "Western egotism and white supremacy" and disparaged their work on the ground that they are in a lesser position to judge China's development compared to the Chinese people. He also regularly complained of the "biased" and "slanderous" character of their articles denouncing the persecution of Uyghurs.

Beating of Taiwanese official in Fiji 

In October 2020, a Taiwanese official was beaten by two Chinese embassy staffers in Fiji. The incident took place at a venue where Fijian and Taiwanese officials were celebrating Taiwan's national day. The Taiwanese official was later treated at a hospital for head injuries.

2020 Olympics
Chinese diplomats engaged in wolf warrior diplomacy during the 2020 Olympics with issue being taken with the way Chinese athletes were being depicted by the media and by the Taiwanese team being introduced as "Taiwan" instead of Chinese Taipei. The Chinese consulate in New York City complained that NBC had used an inaccurate map of China in their coverage because it didn't include Taiwan and the South China Sea.

Chinese consulate in Manchester

In October 2022, a Hong Kong protester was dragged into the Chinese consulate in Manchester and beaten by its staffers. Analysts say that the incident is consistent with China's hawkish rhetoric and aggressive foreign policy of recent years.

Response
China's wolf warrior diplomacy has been positively received by domestic Chinese audiences. Internationally, wolf warrior diplomacy has often garnered a strong response and in some cases has provoked a backlash against China and specific diplomats. By 2020, The Wall Street Journal was reporting that the rise of wolf warrior diplomacy had left many politicians and businesspeople feeling targeted. In December 2020, Nicolas Chapuis, an ambassador of the European Union to China, warned: "What happened during the last year [...] is a massive disruption or reduction in support in Europe, and elsewhere in the world, about China. And I'm telling that to all my Chinese friends, you need to seriously look at it."

When the Chinese government threatened Miloš Vystrčil, the president of the Czech Senate, for addressing Taiwan's national legislature, Reporyje Mayor Pavel Novotny called Chinese Foreign Minister Wang Yi a Chinese "wolf warrior diplomat".

In 2023 Chen Yonglin, a former Chinese diplomat who defected to Australia in 2005, said that "Taiwan has benefited from China's 'wolf warrior' diplomacy."

Cat warrior diplomacy
The Taiwanese representative to the United States Hsiao Bi-khim, has been described as a "cat warrior" and has started using the term herself. Cat warrior diplomacy is seen as focusing on the soft power aspects of Taiwan's advanced economy, democracy, and respect for human rights as well as using Chinese aggression to highlight the differences between their two political systems.

Bondaz effect 

Wolf warrior diplomacy has been described as counterproductive by an IRSEM report in September 2021, introducing the "Bondaz effect" concept by using a case from March 2021 when Antoine Bondaz, a French researcher intervened against the pressure exerted by Lu Shaye, the Chinese ambassador to France, on Twitter to dissuade French senators from traveling to Taiwan. In response, he was described as a “small-time thug” by the embassy, ​​prompting immediate condemnation from many researchers, journalists and politicians who expressed their support for Antoine Bondaz.

The embassy published a press release on its website in which Antoine Bondaz was described as a “mad hyena” and an “ideological troll”. The Global Times internationalized the affair by publishing several articles in English supporting the ambassador and attacking again Antoine Bondaz. He denounced "an all-out, coordinated attack, mobilizing the means of the [Chinese] State to seek to discredit [him] and silence [him]."

In three days, Antoine Bondaz gained more than 3,000 followers on Twitter, gave numerous interviews to the press, radio and television. The affair weakened the embassy's partnerships and stirred up diplomatic tensions between China and France. It was part of a sequence from March 15 to 22, 2021 with "disastrous" consequences for China's public image in France and contributed increasing the awareness of political leaders and the French population on the practices of Chinese authorities.

This case was presented by the IRSEM report as an example of wolf warrior diplomacy, demonstrating the perverse effect of this strategy of influence, the embassy having drawn attention to the work of Antoine Bondaz by wanting to discredit him.

References

2017 establishments in China
Anti-Western sentiment
Chinese foreign policy
Foreign relations of China
People's Republic of China diplomacy
Xi Jinping
Chinese nationalism
Metaphors referring to wolves
Anti-American sentiment in China